Chernovaya is a rural locality (a selo) in Sychyovsky Selsoviet, Smolensky District, Altai Krai, Russia. The population was 259 as of 2013. There are 4 streets.

Geography 
Chernovaya is located 58 km south of Smolenskoye (the district's administrative centre) by road. Krasny Gorodok is the nearest rural locality.

References 

Rural localities in Smolensky District, Altai Krai